101 Second Street is an office tower located in the South of Market district in San Francisco, California on Mission Street. It is known for its glass-clad, four-story atrium which functions as public space. Its art pavilion has included commissions by painter Charles Arnoldi and sculptor Larry Bell. On warm days, the building at street level is opened.

History

The Genesis of the project began in the early 1990s and was originally designed as a "point tower" exceeding 40 stories for a Canadian developer. The design of the 'point tower' was crafted by Skidmore, Owings, and Merrill/San Francisco under the direction of Larry Doane and Steve O'Brien and won what at the time was a 'beauty competition' managed through the San Francisco Building Department. The project was voted through just before the economy for Class A office buildings fell into a severe recession and the developer for the project developed financial difficulties. The site changed hands and is currently managed by Hines. The site sat dormant and was redesigned around 1994 by Steve O'Brien. O'Brien's masterful massing partii is what survives to this day. The reorganization of SOM and the ongoing sluggish economy affected the final outcome of the design of 101 Second Street although much of the structure, including the public atrium and stepping down towards Second Street, can be attributed to O'Brien. Design Partners Brian Lee and Craig Hartman picked up the final detailing of the project after Larry Doane and Steve O'Brien.

Prior to September 11, 2001, a public loggia had been proposed for the upper floor to provide San Franciscans with a public open space unparalleled in any American City at that time. Even today, the proposal for a public open air, open space 24 stories in the air is unrivaled in the United States. Due to security and operational concerns, the concept was abandoned and the requisite open space requirements were placed in a mezzanine that is part of the atrium facing Second Street.

101 Second Street was developed by a partnership of Cousins Properties Incorporated and Myers Development Company, along with 55 Second Street.  Both properties were sold to an affiliate of Hines Interests Limited Partnership in September 2004 for US$282 million, of which US$144 million was for 101 Second Street.  Hines sold 101 Second Street to Invesco Real Estate for about $297 million in January 2014.

Tenants
 King & Spalding LLP
 Reed Smith
 Ziff Davis Media, Inc.
 Moss Adams LLP
 Nexant, Inc.
 The Punak Group
 Aspiriant
 CV Starr & Co.
 Stupski Foundation
 Clyde & Co
 Prosper Marketplace
 ServiceNow Inc
 Pramp Inc
 HashiCorp

See also
List of tallest buildings in San Francisco

References

External links
 101 Second Street  at Hines Interests Limited Partnership

Skyscraper office buildings in San Francisco
Office buildings completed in 2000
Hines Interests Limited Partnership
Skidmore, Owings & Merrill buildings
South of Market, San Francisco
2000 establishments in California